The 2020 Superettan is part of the 2020 Swedish football season, and the 20th season of Superettan, Sweden's second-tier football division in its current format. A total of 16 teams contest the league.

Teams
A total of 16 teams contest the league. The top two teams qualify directly for promotion to Allsvenskan, the third will enter a play-off for the chance of promotion. The two bottom teams are automatically relegated, while the 13th and 14th placed teams will compete in a play-off to determine whether they are relegated.

Stadia and locations

League table

Playoffs
The 13th-placed and 14th-placed teams of Superettan met the two runners-up from 2020 Division 1 (Norra and Södra) in two-legged ties on a home-and-away basis with the teams from Superettan finishing at home.

Landskrona BoIS won 3–1 on aggregate.

 
2–2 on aggregate. Trelleborgs FF won 4–1 on penalties.

Positions by round

Results

Season statistics

Top scorers

Top assists

Hat-tricks

Discipline

Player
 Most yellow cards: 9
 Enis Ahmetovic (Umeå)
 Filip Almström Tähti (Västerås)
 James Keene (Öster)
 Oscar Lundin (Brage)

 Most red cards: 2
 Linus Dahl (Ljungskile)

Club
 Most yellow cards: 59
IK Brage

 Most red cards: 5
Jönköpings Södra IF

References

External links 

 Swedish Football Association - Superettan

Superettan seasons
2020 in Swedish association football leagues
Sweden
Sweden